Carpenter's Point is an unincorporated community in Cecil County, Maryland, United States.  Carpenter Point was the site of the first permanent settlement in Cecil County, established on July 20, 1658, when William Carpenter patented  of land called Anna Catherine Neck, abutting Bay Head Creek, now Principio Creek; Simon Carpenter was assigned this tract of land in 1662. On June 7, 1674, a court was held at the house of Francis Wright at Carpenter’s Point.  A painting by the noted painter James Peale titled “The Ramsay-Polk Family at Carpenter’s Point, Cecil County, Maryland” shows the landing in the background in the 18th century.

References

Unincorporated communities in Cecil County, Maryland
Unincorporated communities in Maryland
Maryland populated places on the Chesapeake Bay